Löbichau is a municipality in the district Altenburger Land, in Thuringia, Germany.

The Ostthüringer Zeitung (OTZ) has its head office in the municipality.

References

External links
 Official website 
 Ostthüringer Zeitung 

Altenburger Land
Duchy of Saxe-Altenburg